Sommariva may refer to:
 Sommariva (surname)
 Sommariva Perno, a commune in Italy
 Sommariva del Bosco, a commune in Italy
 Sommariva, Queensland, a locality in Murweh Shire, Australia